Lasswade Road railway station served the village of Lasswade, Midlothian, Scotland from 1843 to 1849 on the Edinburgh and Dalkeith Railway.

History 
The station opened in June 1843 by the Edinburgh and Dalkeith Railway. The station was situated on both sides of Lasswade Road. A North British Railway map from 1844 shows that this was an intermediate station on the line. It is unlikely that the station had any facilities or platforms. When the NBR took over the line, the station was closed for re-gauging and never reopened.

References

External links 

Disused railway stations in Midlothian
Former North British Railway stations
Railway stations in Great Britain opened in 1843
Railway stations in Great Britain closed in 1849
1843 establishments in Scotland
Bonnyrigg and Lasswade